Check It Out may refer to:

Television
 Check It Out! (Canadian TV series), a TV series that aired on CTV in the 1980s
 Check It Out (UK TV series), a youth TV series produced by Tyne Tees in the late 1970s
 Check It Out! with Dr. Steve Brule, an American TV series, starring John C. Reilly

Music
 Check It Out (album), a 1973 album by Tavares, or its titletrack
 "Ch-Check It Out", a 2004 song by the Beastie Boys
 "Check It Out" (John Mellencamp song), a song by John Mellencamp from the album The Lonesome Jubilee, 1987
 "Check It Out" (song), a 2010 song by will.i.am and Nicki Minaj
 "Check It Out", a song by the Friends of Distinction from the album Whatever, 1970
 "Check It Out", a song by Bobby Womack from the album I Don't Know What the World Is Coming To, 1975
 "Check It Out", a song by Dynasty from the album Right Back at Cha!, 1982
 "Check It Out", a song by Fu-Schnickens and Dres from the album F.U. Don't Take It Personal, 1992
 "Check It Out", a song by Das EFX from the album Straight Up Sewaside, 1993
 "Check It Out", a song by Bob Andy